Iris hookeri, commonly called the beach head iris, is a species of Iris. It is endemic to sea coasts and beaches in Maine, in the Northeastern United States and also eastern Canada.

It blooms in July.

It was first published by the English botanist George Penny in 'Hort. Brit.'(edited by J.C.Loudon), edition 2 on page 591 in 1832, based on an earlier description by George Don.

The Latin specific epithet hookeri refers to the English botanist William Jackson Hooker.

It is found in Eastern Canada within the states of Québec, Nova Scotia, Prince Edward Island, New Brunswick, Newfoundland and Labrador.

It was verified by United States Department of Agriculture and the Agricultural Research Service on 4 April 2003, and as being an accepted name by the RHS.

References

External links
 Flower images

hookeri
Flora of Maine
Endemic flora of the United States
Flora without expected TNC conservation status